In the study of dynamical systems, a hyperbolic equilibrium point or hyperbolic fixed point is a fixed point that does not have any center manifolds. Near a hyperbolic point the orbits of a two-dimensional, non-dissipative system resemble hyperbolas.  This fails to hold in general.  Strogatz notes that "hyperbolic is an unfortunate name—it sounds like it should mean 'saddle point'—but it has become standard." Several properties hold about a neighborhood of a hyperbolic point, notably

 A stable manifold and an unstable manifold exist,
 Shadowing occurs,
 The dynamics on the invariant set can be represented via symbolic dynamics,
 A natural measure can be defined,
 The system is structurally stable.

Maps 
If  is a C1 map and p is a fixed point then p is said to be a hyperbolic fixed point when the Jacobian matrix  has no eigenvalues on the unit circle.

One example of a map whose only fixed point is hyperbolic is Arnold's cat map:

Since the eigenvalues are given by

 

We know that the Lyapunov exponents are:

 

Therefore it is a saddle point.

Flows 

Let  be a C1 vector field with a critical point p, i.e., F(p) = 0, and let J denote the Jacobian matrix of F at p. If the matrix J has no eigenvalues with zero real parts then p is called hyperbolic. Hyperbolic fixed points may also be called hyperbolic critical points or elementary critical points.

The Hartman–Grobman theorem states that the orbit structure of a dynamical system in a neighbourhood of a hyperbolic equilibrium point is topologically equivalent to the orbit structure of the linearized dynamical system.

Example 
Consider the nonlinear system
 

(0, 0) is the only equilibrium point. The linearization at the equilibrium is

For all values of α ≠ 0, the eigenvalues have non-zero real part. Thus, this equilibrium point is a hyperbolic equilibrium point. The linearized system will behave similar to the non-linear system near (0, 0). When α = 0, the system has a nonhyperbolic equilibrium at (0, 0).

Comments 
In the case of an infinite dimensional system—for example systems involving a time delay—the notion of the "hyperbolic part of the spectrum" refers to the above property.

See also 

 Anosov flow
 Hyperbolic set
 Normally hyperbolic invariant manifold

Notes

References 

 

Limit sets
Stability theory